Castrada is a genus of flatworms belonging to the family Typhloplanidae.

The species of this genus are found in Europe.

Species:
 Castrada affinis Hofsten, 1907 
 Castrada annebergensis Luther, 1946

References

Rhabditophora
Rhabditophora genera